Tonsan station is a railway station in Tonsal-li, greater Tanch'ŏn city, South Hamgyŏng province, North Korea, on the Kŭmgol Line of the Korean State Railway. It was opened on 4 December 1943 along with the rest of the Tongam–Paekkŭmsan section of the line; the station was originally called Hamnam Unsong station (Chosōn'gŭl:함남운송역; Hanja: 咸南雲松駅), receiving its current name after the establishment of the DPRK.

References

Railway stations in North Korea